Pavel Horváth (born 22 April 1975) is a Czech former professional footballer who played as a midfielder, and a football manager. He was in charge of Příbram.

He spent the better part of his 22-year professional career with Slavia Prague (four years), Teplice (three) and Viktoria Plzeň (seven), amassing Czech First League totals of 435 games and 78 goals during 19 seasons. He also competed professionally in Portugal, Turkey and Japan.

Horvath was a Czech international for three years.

Club career
After making his professional debut with AC Sparta Prague, Prague-born Horváth moved to lowly FK Jablonec in search of more opportunities, which led to a return to the capital with SK Slavia, scoring 27 goals in the league alone in four seasons, although the club only managed to win two national cups during that timeframe.

Horváth's exploits with Slavia earned him a transfer to Sporting Clube de Portugal, but he failed to win a place in the starting XI. Sold in January 2002 to Galatasaray S.K. alongside teammate Mbo Mpenza, he also appeared very rarely, which prompted a return home before 2001–02 was over, with FK Teplice, where he conquered the domestic cup in his first full campaign.

After three years in Japan Horváth moved back to Sparta for two more seasons, where he won the national championship for the first time in 2007, adding the 2007 and 2008 Czech Cups. Subsequently, aged 33, he signed for FC Viktoria Plzeň, netting eight times during the 2008–09 season as the club finished in eighth place.

Horváth won the domestic cup for the sixth time with his fourth different team, as he captained Viktoria to its first title in the competition in 2010. He was also named the Personality of the League at the Czech Footballer of the Year awards in that year.

Thirty-five-year-old Horváth continued to produce in the 2010–11 season, scoring eight goals in 26 games as Plzeň was crowned league champion the first time in its history.

Controversy
In September 2007, Horváth was fined 200,000 Czech koruna for apparently performing the Nazi salute during Sparta's league match against FK Viktoria Žižkov. He apologized for the incident, and said that his gesture was misinterpreted, claiming he was only trying to calm down his team's rowdies.

International career
Horváth made his debut for the Czech Republic on 9 February 1999 in a 1–0 friendly win in Belgium, going on to amass 19 caps in three years and being selected for UEFA Euro 2000, where he did not play.

His international career was vastly barred by the talent of fellow midfielders Patrik Berger, Pavel Nedvěd and Vladimír Šmicer.

Coaching career
Horváth became the manager of FC Viktoria Plzeň's U21 squad in October 2016 simultaneously with his assistant manager role for the first team of the club. 

After one year as the manager of FK Baník Sokolov, Horváth returned to Viktoria Plzeň and was hired as the U21 manager again. This was announced on 4 January 2019.

On 11 March 2020 Horváth became manager of Czech First League club Příbram. On 15 March 2021, Horváth was sacked as the head coach of Příbram after series of poor results (39 matches, 8 wins, 5 draws, 19 losses) with team on last place of league table.

Career statistics

Club
Sources:

Notes

International
Source:

Honours

Club
Slavia Prague
Czech Cup: 1996–97, 1998–99

Sporting
Primeira Liga: 2001–02

Teplice
Czech Cup: 2002–03

Sparta Prague
Czech First League: 2006–07
Czech Cup: 2006–07, 2007–08

Viktoria Plzeň
Czech First League: 2010–11, 2012–13, 2014–15
Czech Cup: 2009–10
Czech Supercup: 2011

References

External links
 Viktoria Plzeň official profile 
 
 
 
 
 
 

Czech people of Hungarian descent
1975 births
Living people
Footballers from Prague
Czech footballers
Czech football managers
Association football midfielders
Czech First League players
AC Sparta Prague players
FK Jablonec players
SK Slavia Prague players
FK Teplice players
FC Viktoria Plzeň players
Primeira Liga players
Sporting CP footballers
Süper Lig players
Galatasaray S.K. footballers
J1 League players
J2 League players
Vissel Kobe players
Czech Republic under-21 international footballers
Czech Republic international footballers
UEFA Euro 2000 players
Czech expatriate footballers
Expatriate footballers in Portugal
Expatriate footballers in Turkey
Expatriate footballers in Japan
Czech expatriate sportspeople in Portugal
Czech expatriate sportspeople in Turkey
Czech expatriate sportspeople in Japan
FK Baník Sokolov managers
1. FK Příbram managers
Czech First League managers